Cole Gatlin Ragans (born December 12, 1997) is an American professional baseball pitcher for the Texas Rangers of Major League Baseball (MLB). He made his MLB debut in 2022.

Amateur career
Ragans attended North Florida Christian High School in Tallahassee, Florida. In his senior season, Ragans went 9–0 with a 0.90 ERA and 104 strikeouts over 70 innings. He committed to play college baseball for the Florida State Seminoles. Ragans was drafted by the Texas Rangers, with the 30th overall selection, in the first round of the 2016 Major League Baseball Draft. He signed with Texas for a $2,003,400 signing bonus.

Professional career
After signing, he was assigned to the AZL Rangers of the Rookie-level Arizona League, posting a 4.70 ERA in  innings. He spent 2017 with the Spokane Indians of the Class A Short Season Northwest League, where he pitched to a 3–2 record and a 3.61 ERA along with 87 strikeouts in  innings.

Ragans underwent Tommy John surgery in March 2018 and missed all of the 2018 season. On May 14, 2019, the Rangers announced that Ragans had suffered a tear in the graft of his surgically repaired left elbow during his rehabilitation process. The tear resulted in a second Tommy John procedure which resulted in him missing the entire 2019 season. Ragans did not play in 2020 due to the cancellation of the Minor League Baseball season because of the COVID-19 pandemic. Ragans opened the 2021 season with the Hickory Crawdads of the High-A East. In June 2021, Ragans was selected to play in the All-Star Futures Game. Ragans was promoted to the Frisco RoughRiders of the Double-A Central on July 18, after going 1–2 with a 3.25 ERA and 54 strikeouts over  innings for Hickory. He finished 2021 after posting a 3–1 record with a 5.70 ERA and 33 strikeouts over  innings for Frisco. Ragans returned to Frisco to open the 2022 season, going 5–3 with a 2.81 ERA and 65 strikeouts over  innings, before being promoted to the Round Rock Express of the Triple-A Pacific Coast League on June 14. Over 8 starts for Round Rock, Ragans went 3–2 with a 3.32 ERA and 48 strikeouts over  innings. He was named the Texas Rangers 2022 Nolan Ryan Pitcher of the Year. 

On August 4, 2022, Texas selected Ragans' contract and promoted him to the active roster for the first time. In his MLB debut that night versus the Chicago White Sox, Ragans allowed one unearned run over five innings while recording three strikeouts. Over 9 game for Texas, Ragans went 0–3 with a 4.96 ERA and 27 strikeouts over 40 innings in 2022.

References

External links

1997 births
Living people
People from Crawfordville, Florida
Baseball players from Florida
Major League Baseball pitchers 
Texas Rangers players
Arizona League Rangers players
Spokane Indians players
Hickory Crawdads players
Frisco RoughRiders players
Round Rock Express players